Hiramsburg is an unincorporated community in Noble County, in the U.S. state of Ohio.

History
Hiramsburg was platted in 1836 by Hiram Calvert, and named for him. A post office was established at Hiramsburg in 1837, and remained in operation until 1920.

References

Unincorporated communities in Noble County, Ohio